Polycomb protein SUZ12 is a protein that in humans is encoded by the SUZ12 gene.

Function 

This zinc finger gene has been identified at the breakpoints of a recurrent chromosomal translocation reported in endometrial stromal sarcoma. Recombination of these breakpoints results in the fusion of this gene and JAZF1. The protein encoded by this gene contains a zinc finger domain in the C terminus of the coding region. The specific function of this gene has not yet been determined.

SUZ12, as part of Polycomb Repressive Complex 2 (PRC2), may be involved with chromatin silencing in conjunction with HOTAIR ncRNA, using its zinc-finger domain to bind the RNA molecule.

References

Further reading

External links